Blastobasis lygdi is a moth in the family Blastobasidae. It is found in Costa Rica.

The length of the forewings is 4.2–6.1 mm. The forewings are pale brown intermixed with brown and brownish-yellow scales. The hindwings are translucent brown or translucent brown gradually darkening towards the apex.

Etymology
The specific epithet is derived from Latin lygdos (meaning white marble).

References

Moths described in 2013
Blastobasis